Nudaria punctata is a moth of the subfamily Arctiinae first described by Georg Semper in 1899. It is found in the Philippines.

References

Nudariina